Al Halmandy v. Bush, No. 1:05-cv-02385, is a writ of habeas corpus filed on behalf of 63 Guantanamo detainees, on December 13, 2005. It was one of over 200 habeas corpus petitions filed on behalf of detainees held in the Guantanamo Bay detention camp in Cuba.

The writ was filed shortly before the passage of the Detainee Treatment Act of 2005, which contained provisions to close off captives' ability to initiate new habeas petitions.

Seizure of privileged lawyer-client documents

On June 10, 2006 the Department of Defense reported that three captives died in custody.
The Department of Defense stated the three men committed suicide.
Camp authorities called the deaths "an act of asymmetric warfare", and suspected plans had been coordinated by the captive's attorneys—so they seized all the captives' documents, including the captives' copies of their habeas documents.
Since the habeas documents were privileged lawyer-client communication the 
Department of Justice was compelled to file documents about the document seizures.
When the Department of Defense reported to the Justice Department the names of the captives whose privileged documents they seized, they were unable to name half of the captives in this petition.

Military Commissions Act

The Military Commissions Act of 2006 mandated that Guantanamo captives were no longer entitled to access the U.S. civil justice system, so all outstanding habeas corpus petitions were stayed.

Boumediene v. Bush

On June 12, 2008 the United States Supreme Court ruled, in Boumediene v. Bush, that the Military Commissions Act could not remove the right for Guantanamo captives to access the U.S. Federal Court system, and all previous Guantanamo captives' habeas petitions were eligible to be re-instated.

On July 18, 2008 Shayana D. Kadidal of the Center for Constitutional Rights filed a status report on Al Halmandy v. Bush No. 05-CV-2385 (RMU) on behalf of seven Guantanamo captives Kadidal wrote that of the 63 captives initially listed in the petition, all but those seven had either been repatriated, or were named in other petitions.

On July 29, 2008 U.S. District Court Judge Thomas F. Hogan ordered that all the other petitioners would be dismissed from the petition, except for:
{| class="wikitable" border="1"
|+ Seven remaining petitioners on Al Halmandy v. Bush
|-
! ISN || name || Kadidal's notes
|-
| 78 || Saleh ||
 Factual return filed on 30 October 2008. As of early December 2008 his attorneys had still not been able to meet with him.
|-
| 510 || Riad Nargeri ||
 Factual return filed on 29 October 2008.  As of early December 2008 his attorneys had still not been able to meet with him. A thirty-day protective order was filed on his behalf.
|-
| 570 || Sabry Mohammed ||
 Factual return filed on 30 October 2008. As of early December 2008 his attorneys had still not been able to meet with him.
|-
| 574 || Hamound Abdullah Hamoud Hassan Al Wady ||
 On 21 November 2008 Carlton F. Gunn filed a "NOTICE OF APPEARANCE" with regard to Hamound Abdullah Hamoud Hassan Al Wady (ISN 574) in Civil Action No. 05-cv-2385 (RMC).
 A Joint Status Report, filed on 8 December 2008, states:
{| class="wikitable" border="1"
|
"The Government filed a return containing allegations against Petitioner Al Wady on October 31, 2008. Following entry of the CMO on November 6, 2008, Mr. Al Wady submitted a written request for discovery pursuant to Part I.E.1 of the CMO on November 15, 2008, which discovery the Government has not yet provided. On November 26, 2008, Mr. Al Wady filed a response to the Government's Motion for Clarification and Reconsideration or, in the Alternative, Motion for Certification for Appeal." 
|}
|-
| 743 || Muhammed Saad Iqbal Madni ||
 Madni had a duplicate petition in Civil Action No. 06-CV-1674 (RMC), filed September 29, 2006 under the name Qari Saad Iqbal, which he withdrew voluntarily on February 12, 2007. Judge Collyer dismissed that case without prejudice on February 12, 2007.
 Pursuant to the Detainee Treatment Act (DTA), petitioner Madni filed a Petition for Review of Combat Status Review Tribunal Determination with the U.S. Court of Appeals for the District of Columbia Circuit on April 3, 2007, No. 07-1083. There is a protective order in place in that case. Madni's DTA petition is still pending before the Court of Appeals.
 A Joint Status Report, filed on 8 December 2008, states:
{| class="wikitable" border="1"
|
"Although his habeas petition remains pending before this Court, counsel for Mr. Madni understands that the Court does not intend to consider his outstanding claims during the present status proceedings."
|}
|-
| 900 || Saki Bacha ||
 Now known as Mohammed Jawad.
 Faces charges before a Guantanamo military commission:
{|
|
...accusing him of throwing a hand grenade into a vehicle carrying U.S. and allied personnel in Afghanistan, were sworn on October 9, 2007, and referred for trial on January 30, 2008. It has been widely reported in the news media that Jawad was sixteen years old at the time of the alleged attack..."
|}
 As of December 2008 no factual return has been filed.
|-
| 1045 || Mohammed Kameen ||
 Faces charges before a Guantanamo military commission:
{|
|
...accusing him of providing material support to hostilities against U.S. and allied armed forces in Afghanistan, were sworn on March 12, 2008, and referred for trial on April 4, 2008.
|}
 As of December 2008 no factual return has been filed.
|}

Known original petitioners dismissed from the petition
{| class="wikitable" border="1"
|+ Known original petitioners on Al Halmandy v. Bush dismissed from the petition
|-
! isn || name || notes
|-
| 118 || Abd Al Rahman Abdullah Al Halmandy ||
 Named on an April 7, 2007 motion to dismiss, because he had "left GTMO".
|-
| 367 || Inshanullah ||
 Named on an April 7, 2007 motion to dismiss, because he had "left GTMO".
|-
| 783 || Shamsullah ||
 Named on an April 7, 2007 motion to dismiss, because he had "left GTMO".
|-
| 005 || Abul Aziz Al Matrafi ||
 Privileged attorney client documents seized by camp authorities.
|-
|| 044 || Mohamed Rajab ||
 Privileged attorney client documents seized by camp authorities.
|-
| 046 || Saif ||
 Privileged attorney client documents seized by camp authorities.
|-
| 051 || Majed Baryan ||
 Privileged attorney client documents seized by camp authorities.
|-
| 062 || Saud Al Jouhany ||
 Privileged attorney client documents seized by camp authorities.
|-
| 088 || Waqas Mohammed Ali Awad ||
 Privileged attorney client documents seized by camp authorities.
|-
| 118 || Abd Al Rahman Abdullah Al Halmandy ||
 Privileged attorney client documents seized by camp authorities.
|-
| 174 || Hisham ||
 Privileged attorney client documents seized by camp authorities.
|-
| 196 || Moussa ||
 Privileged attorney client documents seized by camp authorities.
|-
| 215 || Sultan Al Shareef ||
 Privileged attorney client documents seized by camp authorities.
|-
| 326 || Abu Rawdah ||
 Privileged attorney client documents seized by camp authorities.
|-
| 367 || Inshanullah ||
 Privileged attorney client documents seized by camp authorities.
|-
| 502 || Adel ||
 Privileged attorney client documents seized by camp authorities.
|-
| 627 || Dr. Ayman ||
 Privileged attorney client documents seized by camp authorities.
|-
| 678 || Fawaz (Guantanamo captive 678) ||
 Privileged attorney client documents seized by camp authorities.
|-
| 704 || Abdu Tawab ||
 Privileged attorney client documents seized by camp authorities.
|-
| 707 || Muhammad Nur Uthman Muhammad ||
 Privileged attorney client documents seized by camp authorities.
|-
| 717 || Abdul Al Hamman ||
 Privileged attorney client documents seized by camp authorities.
|-
| 721 || Abdulla (Guantanamo captive 721) ||
 Privileged attorney client documents seized by camp authorities.
|-
| 743 || Muhammed Saad Iqbal Madni ||
 Privileged attorney client documents seized by camp authorities.
|-
| 743 || Said Madany ||
 Privileged attorney client documents seized by camp authorities.
|-
| 783 || Shamsullah ||
 Privileged attorney client documents seized by camp authorities.
|-
| 892 || Rafiove bin Bashir ||
 Privileged attorney client documents seized by camp authorities.
|-
| 900 || Saki Bacha ||
 Privileged attorney client documents seized by camp authorities.
|-
| 1017 || Zakaria ||
 Privileged attorney client documents seized by camp authorities.
|-
| 1045 || Mohammed Kameen ||
 Privileged attorney client documents seized by camp authorities.
|-
| 1457 || Abdo Ali Al Haj ||
 Privileged attorney client documents seized by camp authorities.
|-
| 1463 || Abdulrahman ||
 Privileged attorney client documents seized by camp authorities.
|-
| || Ibrahim Nayif Abdallah Ibrahim ||
 Privileged attorney client documents seized by camp authorities.
|-
| || Abu Baker Shammrany ||
 Privileged attorney client documents seized by camp authorities.
|-
| || Saleh Libi ||
 Privileged attorney client documents seized by camp authorities.
|-
| || Salah Deen Ibn Shaikh ||
 Privileged attorney client documents seized by camp authorities.
|-
| || Salih ||
 Privileged attorney client documents seized by camp authorities.
|-
| || Ridah ||
 Privileged attorney client documents seized by camp authorities.
|-
| || Abdullah || 
 Privileged attorney client documents seized by camp authorities.
|-
| || Sanjawez Raweel Kameel Weej ||
 Privileged attorney client documents seized by camp authorities.
|-
| || Abdal Rauf Zalitini ||
 Privileged attorney client documents seized by camp authorities.
|-
| || Ahamed ||
 Privileged attorney client documents seized by camp authorities.
|-
| || Abdullah ali Saleh ||
 Privileged attorney client documents seized by camp authorities.
|-
| || Othman Ali Muhammed Omar ||
 Privileged attorney client documents seized by camp authorities.
|-
| || Amar Biloushi ||
 Privileged attorney client documents seized by camp authorities.
|-
| || Mohammed Chinguity ||
 Privileged attorney client documents seized by camp authorities.
|-
| || Abdulrahman ||
 Privileged attorney client documents seized by camp authorities.
|-
| || Ali Kadami ||
 Privileged attorney client documents seized by camp authorities.
|-
| || Khalid Deshire ||
 Privileged attorney client documents seized by camp authorities.
|-
| || Abou Yassir Jezairi ||
 Privileged attorney client documents seized by camp authorities.
|-
| || Abdaul Razak Ali-Haj ||
 Privileged attorney client documents seized by camp authorities.
|-
| || Adnan ||
 Privileged attorney client documents seized by camp authorities.
|-
| || Abdullah Jaffa ||
 Privileged attorney client documents seized by camp authorities.
|-
| || Abu Hadifa ||
 Privileged attorney client documents seized by camp authorities.
|-
| || Mohammed Abdullah ||
 Privileged attorney client documents seized by camp authorities.
|-
| || Mohamed Fahad Saad Al Zu'bi ||
 Privileged attorney client documents seized by camp authorities.
|-
| || Abdul Aziz ||
 Privileged attorney client documents seized by camp authorities.
|-
| || Abdul Latif ||
 Privileged attorney client documents seized by camp authorities.
|-
| || Abdulla Haji ||
 Privileged attorney client documents seized by camp authorities.
|-
| || Bital Adel Halami ||
 Privileged attorney client documents seized by camp authorities.
|-
| || Saleh ||
 Privileged attorney client documents seized by camp authorities.
|-
| || Khalid Mohammed ||
 Privileged attorney client documents seized by camp authorities.
|-
| || Mahdi Salih ||
 Privileged attorney client documents seized by camp authorities.
|-
| || Masoud ||
 Privileged attorney client documents seized by camp authorities.
|}

Muhammed Saad Iqbal Madni

On September 2, 2008 
Muhammed Saad Iqbal Madni's lawyers were informed he had been repatriated to Pakistani custody.
On September 5, 2008 the Department of Justice filed a motion to have his habeas petition dismissed as moot because he was no longer in U.S. custody.
On September 19, 2008
Richard L. Cys, James P. Walsh filed "Petitioner Muhammed Saad Iqbal Madni's response to court order to show cause why his petition should not be dismissed as moot".
Madni's lawyers argued his habeas petition should not be dismissed because he was entitled to continue to seek relief if his original detention was not legally justified.  Further, his lawyer had not been advised of the conditions agreed upon by the U.S. Government and the Pakistani Government.

References

Guantanamo captives' habeas corpus petitions
United States District Court for the District of Columbia cases